Eutomolasma is a genus of symmetrical sessile barnacles in the family Pachylasmatidae. There are at least four described species in Eutomolasma.

Species
These species belong to the genus Eutomolasma:
 Eutomolasma chinense (Pilsbry, 1912)
 Eutomolasma japonicum (Hiro, 1933)
 Eutomolasma maclaughlinae Jones, 2000
 Eutomolasma orbiculatum Jones, 2000

References

External links

 

Barnacles